Family Nest is a 1979 Hungarian black-and-white drama film, directed by Béla Tarr. The film won Grand Prize at the 1979 Mannheim-Heidelberg International Film Festival, tying with Spanish film El Super.

Plot

The film follows a young couple as they live in apartment of the husband's parents, as well as the wife's efforts to find new housing.

Cast
Laszlone Horvath as Irén
László Horváth as Laci
Gábor Kun as Laci's Father
Gaborne Kún as Laci Mother

Reception
Family Nest received moderately positive reviews from film critics. Rotten Tomatoes reports an 80% approval rating, with an average rating of 6.9/10. Jonathan Rosenbaum of Chicago Reader wrote, "This is strong stuff, but the highly formal director of Almanac of Fall, Damnation, and Satantango is still far from apparent." Keith Uhlich of Slant Magazine rated the film 2/4 stars and called the characters "unconvincing mouthpieces for a highly unsubtle political critique."

References

External links

1979 drama films
1979 films
Films directed by Béla Tarr
1970s Hungarian-language films
Hungarian drama films